The Modern Amazons: Warrior Women On-Screen by Dominique Mainon and James Ursini, published by Hal Leonard/Limelight Editions is a non-fiction book documenting the evolution of the female action hero in cinema, television and pop-culture. From Barbarella to Barb Wire, the book surveys the public's interest with the warrior-woman and amazon archetype in media. From the same authors who wrote Cinema of Obsession: Erotic Fixation and Love Gone Wrong in the Movies, this book also contains hundreds of illustrations, and a complete bibliography, an extensive 30-page filmography, as well as sidebars about trends, style, and trivia. The warrior-woman image throughout the past five decades is explored, from the iconic Raquel Welch in the prehistoric adventure fantasy One Million Years B.C. in the "fur bikinis and jungle love" chapter, to the blaxploitation films (Coffy, Foxy Brown, and Sheba, Baby) made famous by Pam Grier, the first African-American woman to play a warrior woman within the action movie genre. Included also is Lucy Lawless' six-season portrayal of Xena: Warrior Princess; Angelina Jolie as Lara Croft in two Tomb Raider movies; Sigourney Weaver as Ripley in the sci-fi Alien adventures, and all the various women who have played vampire slayers, superheroes (and villains), as well as assorted television, cartoon, comics, and video game fighter characters in the various movie action/adventure genres. In addition, the book highlights Hong Kong martials arts warriors such as Angela Mao (Enter the Dragon) and Zhang Ziyi (Crouching Tiger, Hidden Dragon) and Cynthia Rothrock, and also sexploitation films, including the controversial Ilsa trilogy.

Theme
The Modern Amazons: Warrior Women On-Screen has been viewed as a sociologically sound study of strong women of this growing female action hero genre in film and TV. It is quoted as having "an authoritative style that’s thankfully free of pretension and stuffiness." It is written from a female perspective (Mainon's) but balanced with scholarly data from verified popcult expert, James Ursini. The book includes analysis of both feminist and lesbian text and subtext in action movies, TV series, and cartoons, such as Powerpuff Girls. as well as - Tank Girl, G.I. Jane, La Femme Nikita, Ripley from Alien - but also not forgetting Pippi Longstocking, Pepper from Police Woman, and Clarice (Jodie Foster) from The Silence of the Lambs.

The book also relates a brief background on warrior women in history, myth, and literature, chronicling the effects of male fantasy and societal values on their portrayal in film and on television, and their overall portrayal in Hollywood. Revenge and loss of family or lover, Oedipal conflicts and sisterhood are among the themes underlying warrior-women movies that are discussed. The book also contains special features sections which include topics such as the "Weapons of Warrior Women," "Occupational Hazards of Superheroines," and the study of the representation of women as felines ("The Feline Woman") and the association of women and snakes in myths and history ("Woman and the Serpent").

References

External links

 official book homepage 
Author's Home Site
Baltimore City Paper
Midwest Book Review
Windy City Times Interview
SirDotAlot Review Site

2006 non-fiction books
Books by Dominique Mainon
American non-fiction books
Gender studies literature
History of film